Hills of Missing Men is a 1922 American silent adventure film directed by J.P. McGowan and starring McGowan, Florence Gilbert and Helen Holmes.

Synopsis
An American army officer goes undercover in Baja California to battle against a powerful magnate allied with a local bandit.

Cast
 J.P. McGowan as Capt. Brandt / The Dragon
 Jean Perry as Crando
 James Wang as Li Fung
 Charles Brinley as Bandini
 Andrew Waldron as Buck Allis
 Florence Gilbert as Hilma Allis
 Helen Holmes as Amy Allis

References

Bibliography
 Munden, Kenneth White. The American Film Institute Catalog of Motion Pictures Produced in the United States, Part 1. University of California Press, 1997.

External links

1922 films
1922 adventure films
American black-and-white films
American adventure films
American silent feature films
Films directed by J. P. McGowan
Associated Exhibitors films
Films set in Mexico
1920s English-language films
1920s American films
Silent adventure films